Aurora Airlines was a charter airline based in Ljubljana, Slovenia.
It operated several flights a week between the biggest cities of Germany to Kosovo.
It had hubs at Pristina, Kosovo, and Maribor, Slovenia. The company operated for defunct airline Airkosova, and had one of its aircraft painted in Air Kosova livery.

Destinations
Kosovo
Pristina (Pristina International Airport Adem Jashari) Hub
Slovenia
Maribor (Maribor Edvard Rusjan Airport) Hub

Fleet
The fleet consisted of three McDonnell Douglas MD-82 and one McDonnell Douglas MD-83.

One of the McDonnell Douglas MD-82 aircraft with registration number S5-ACC was purchased by the Letalski center Maribor for the purpose of the exhibition: Letališka cesta 30, Miklavž na Dravskem polje and is parked on the sports side of Maribor Airport and is available for visitors.

References

External links
Aurora Airlines

Defunct airlines of Slovenia
Airlines established in 2005
Airlines disestablished in 2009
Slovenian companies established in 2005
2009 disestablishments in Slovenia